Victor Argo (November 5, 1934 – April 7, 2004) was an American actor of Puerto Rican descent who usually played the part of a tough bad guy in his movies. He had a career span of forty years. He is best known for Mean Streets (1973), Taxi Driver  (1976), Hot Tomorrows (1977), The Last Temptation of Christ (1988), King of New York (1990), and McBain (1991).

Early years
Argo was born Victor Jimenez in The Bronx, New York. Both of his parents were born in the town of Quebradillas, Puerto Rico.

Professional career
Argo began his career as a stage actor. Attempting to break into show business at a time when there was much prejudice against Latino performers Victor professionally adopted the surname "Argo" to better his casting chances, stating in an interview that he "felt the prejudice was against the name, not even against me." While performing in an Off-Broadway play during the 1960s, Argo met Yoko Ono, with whom he participated in the so-called "Happening" movement. He also became friends with the then fledgling actor Harvey Keitel, with whom he remained close for nearly forty years and would act together in several films with. In 1977, Argo became a founding member of the Riverside Shakespeare Company on New York City's Upper West Side. As a member, he toured the parks of Manhattan playing Lord Montague. 

In the 1970s, Argo made his film debut with a small part in Unholy Rollers and his television debut in a made-for-TV film Smile Jenny, You're Dead. Often playing the part of the NY 'heavy' or mobster on film, Argo was a favorite of such directors as Martin Scorsese, Abel Ferrara and Woody Allen. His film credits include Taxi Driver, King of New York, The Rose, New York Stories, The Last Temptation of Christ, Bad Lieutenant, True Romance and Coyote Ugly. In 2001, he played Jennifer Lopez's father in the romantic drama Angel Eyes. His television guest appearances include The Rockford Files, Wonder Woman, Buck Rogers in the 25th Century, Spenser: For Hire, Law & Order and Miami Vice. Argo lent his talents to seventy-five films and twenty-one television guest roles in total.

Besides acting on the stage and screen another deep passion for Argo was country music, the actor at one time even traveling to the country music capital of the world (Nashville) to cut several song demos.

Filmography
Among the films in which Argo had a role were the following:

 Dealing (1972) as 2nd Cuban
 Boxcar Bertha (1972) as McIver #1
 Unholy Rollers (1972) as Vinnie The Trainer 
 Mean Streets (1973) as Mario
 The Don Is Dead (1973) as Augie 'The Horse'
 The Terminal Man (1974) as Orderly
 Taxi Driver (1976) as Melio, Bodega Clerk
 Hot Tomorrows (1977) as Tony
 Which Way Is Up? (1977) as Angel
 The Rose (1979) as Lockerman
 Hanky Panky (1982) as Pallbearer
 Romando (1982) as Don Piri
 Falling in Love (1984) as Victor Rawlins
 The Electric Chair (1985) as Comic
 Desperately Seeking Susan (1985) as Sergeant Taskal
 After Hours (1985) as Diner Cashier
 Off Beat (1986) as Leon
 Raw Deal (1986) as Dangerous Man
 Florida Straits (1986) as Pablo Cheruka
 The Pick-up Artist (1987) as Harris
 The Last Temptation of Christ (1988) as Peter, Apostle
 Her Alibi (1989) as Avram
 New York Stories (1989) as Cop (segment "Life Lessons")
 Crimes and Misdemeanors (1989) as Detective
 King of New York (1990) as Lieutenant Roy Bishop
 Quick Change (1990) as Mike Skelton
 McBain (1991) as El Presidente
 Shadows and Fog (1991) as Hacker's Vigilante #2
 Bad Lieutenant (1992) as Beat Cop
 True Romance (1993) as Lenny
 Dangerous Game (1993) as Director of Photography
 Household Saints (1993) as Lino Falconetti
 Men Lie (1994) as Scott's Dad
 Monkey Trouble (1994) as Charlie
 Somebody to Love (1994) as Santa Claus
 Smoke (1995) as Vinnie
 Blue in the Face (1995) as Vinnie
 Condition Red (1995) as Victor Klein
 The Funeral (1996) as Julius
 Next Stop Wonderland (1998) as Frank
 Going Nomad (1998) as Spiro
 Lulu on the Bridge (1998) as Pierre
 Side Streets (1998) as Albani Krug
 New Rose Hotel (1998) as Portuguese Business Man
 Fast Horses (1998) as Zack
 On the Run (1999) as Man Shaving
 Coming Soon (1999) as Mr. Neipris
 Ghost Dog: The Way of the Samurai (1999) as Vinny
 Blue Moon (2000) as Tony
 The Yards (2000) as Paul Lazarides
 Fast Food Fast Women (2000) as Seymour
 Love = (Me)^3 (2000) as Mr. Carrera
 Coyote Ugly (2000) as Pete
 Double Whammy (2001) as Lieutenant Spigot
 'R Xmas (2001) as Louie
 Angel Eyes (2001) as Carl Pogue
 Queenie in Love (2001) as Horace
 The Man Who Knew Belle Starr (2001) as Diner Owner
 Don't Say a Word (2001) as Syd Simon
 Bridget (2002) as Grant
 Anything But Love (2002) as Sal
 Dirt (2003) as El Gringo Nestor
 Personal Sergeant (filmed in 2003; released in 2004) as Chuck Manetta
 Lustre (filmed in 2003; released in 2005) as Hugo (final film role)

Later years
Shortly before his death, Argo realized a lifelong dream of performing on Broadway when he was cast as Santiago, the owner of a cigar factory, in the Pulitzer Prize-winning drama Anna in the Tropics. In his last on-screen role, in the independent film Lustre by director Art Jones, Argo portrayed a New York City loan shark who retreats from his everyday, hard-nosed rants to a deeply spiritual disconnect from the world. The film was released in 2005. Argo died in New York City at Saint Vincent's Catholic Medical Center on April 7, 2004 from complications of lung cancer at age 69. His body was donated to Manhattan College for medical science. In 2005, Electronic music group Bodega System released a 12" vinyl LP which includes the track "Victor Argo".

See also
 List of Puerto Ricans

References

External links
 
 
 What You Saw Him In (Movie Morlocks on Victor Argo)

1934 births
2004 deaths
People from the Bronx
Male actors from New York City
American male film actors
American male television actors
Deaths from lung cancer in New York (state)
American people of Puerto Rican descent
American male stage actors
21st-century American male actors
20th-century American male actors